Kanichar  is a village and Grama Panchayat in Kannur district in the Indian state of Kerala.

Hospitals 
There are several hospitals in this place.
Unity Hospital, Kelakam
Peravoor Taluk Hospital
Reshmi Hospital , Peravoor
Primary Health Centre , Kolakkad

Blood Bank 
 Thalassery Blood Donors Wing
 Kannur Sara Memorial Blood Bank
 Thalassery Co-operative Hospital
 Pariyaram Medical College
 General Hospital Thalassery

Demographics 
As of 2011 Census, Kanichar had a population of 15,789 which constitutes 7,778 males and 8,011 females. The sex ratio of Kanichar was 1,030 lower than state average of 1,084. Population of children in the age group 0-6 was 1,508 (9.55%) where 764 are males and 744 are females. Kanichar had an overall literacy of 93.1% lower than state average of 94%. The male literacy stands at 95% and female literacy was 91.2%.

Tourism
Aralam Wildlife Sanctuary,a tourist spot, is about 7 km away from Kanichar town.

Wards 
There are 13 wards in Kanichar Panchayat. 
Odanthode		
Anungode	
Kanichar	
Velloonni
Nellikkunnu	
Chengom
Elapeedika	
Poolakkutty	
Nedumpuramchal	
Odappuzha	
Kolakkad
Mavadi	
Chanappara.

Transportation

The National Highway 66 passes through Kannur town.  Mangalore and Mumbai can be accessed on the northern side and Cochin and Thiruvananthapuram can be accessed on the southern side. The road to the east of Iritty connects to Mysore and Bangalore. The nearest railway station is Kannur on Mangalore-Palakkad line. The nearest airport is Kannur International Airport which is 35 Kilometers Away from Kanichar.

References 

Villages near Iritty